The 2013–14 Nemzeti Bajnokság I/A was the 83rd season of the Nemzeti Bajnokság I/A, the highest tier professional basketball league in Hungary.

Szolnoki Olaj KK won its fifth domestic title, by sweeping Atomerőmű SE 3–0 in the Finals.

Team information 
The following 13 clubs competed in the NB I/A during the 2013–14 season:

Regular season

Standings

Schedule and results
In the table below the home teams are listed on the left and the away teams along the top.

Group 1st to 6th

Standings

Schedule and results
In the table below the home teams are listed on the left and the away teams along the top.

Group 7th to 13th

Standings

Schedule and results
In the table below the home teams are listed on the left and the away teams along the top.

Playoffs
Teams in bold won the playoff series. Numbers to the left of each team indicate the team's original playoff seeding. Numbers to the right indicate the score of each playoff game.

Team roster
4 Balázs Simon, 6 Ákos Keller, 7 Obie Trotter, 8 Vuk Pavlović, 9 Dávid Vojvoda, 10 Radenko Pilčević, 11 Zoltán Tóth, 12 Miljan Rakić, 14 Márton Báder, 15 Tomislav Ivosev, 20 Máté Berkics, 21 Tamás Mándoki, 22 Justin Holiday, 24 Strahinja Milošević, 25 György Csaba, 30 Csaba Csákvári and 44 Péter Lóránt

Head coach: Dragan Aleksić

Final standing

(C) = Champion; (R) = Relegated; (P) = Promoted; (E) = Eliminated; (O) = Play-off winner; (A) = Advances to a further round.

References

External links
 Hungarian Basketball Federaration 

Nemzeti Bajnoksag I/A (men's basketball) seasons
Hungarian
Men